The 2016−17 season of the Regionalliga Südwest was the ninth season of the Regionalliga as the fourth highest division in Germany and started with the opening game on 5 August 2016.

Participants
For the 2016−17 season, the following clubs qualified:
 the relegated clubs from the southwest region of the 2015–16 3. Liga:
 Stuttgarter Kickers, VfB Stuttgart II
 the defeated teams from the Promotion to the 3. Liga:
 SV Elversberg, SV Waldhof Mannheim
 the remaining teams from the Regionalliga Südwest 2015/16:
 Kickers Offenbach, TSG 1899 Hoffenheim II, SV Eintracht Trier 05, FC 08 Homburg, 1. FC Saarbrücken, KSV Hessen Kassel, Wormatia Worms, 1. FC Kaiserslautern II, FC Astoria Walldorf, TSV Steinbach Haiger, FK Pirmasens
 the champion of the 2015–16 Oberliga Rheinland-Pfalz/Saar:
 TuS Koblenz
 the champion of the 2015–16 Oberliga Baden-Württemberg:
 SSV Ulm 1846
 the champion of the 2015–16 Hessenliga:
 SC Teutonia Watzenborn-Steinberg
 the winner of the promotion round to the Regionalliga Südwest:
 FC Nöttingen

Promotion and relegation
Promotion to the 3. Liga
The champion and the runner-up were sportingly qualified for the participation in the Promotion to the 3. Liga.

Relegation from the Regionalliga Südwest
Up to six teams in 14th, 15th and 16th place and safely in 17th, 18th and 19th place relegated. Due to the relegation of 1. FSV Mainz 05 II and FSV Frankfurt from the 3rd division to the Regionalliga Südwest, the number of relegated teams to the Oberliga increased to five. Due to the missed promotion of SV Waldhof Mannheim and SV Elversberg it was clear that a total of six teams had to relegate.

Statistics

Table

(P) Promoted from the 2015–16 Oberliga
(C) Champion of the previous season
(R) Relegated from the 2015–16 3. Liga

Cross table
The cross table shows the results of all games of this season. The home team is listed in the left column, the visiting team in the top row.

Table history
Matches that are postponed will be counted according to the original schedule, so that the same number of matches is taken into account for each team on all match days.

Goal scorer list
If there are the same number of goals, the players are sorted alphabetically by surname, if available.

Spectator table

Stadiums

References

Regionalliga